Note: Names that cannot be confirmed in Wikipedia database nor through given sources are subject to removal. If you would like to add a new name please consider writing about the player first.

This is a partial list of Polish sportspeople.

Alpine skiing 

Andrzej Bachleda-Curuś II
Agnieszka Gąsienica-Daniel
Maryna Gąsienica-Daniel

American football 

Sebastian Janikowski
Rob Gronkowski thru ancestry

Archery 

Iwona Dzięcioł
Katarzyna Klata
Joanna Nowicka
Irena Szydłowska

Athletics 

Andrzej Badeński
Sylwester Bednarek
Teresa Ciepły
Kamila Chudzik
Paweł Czapiewski
Marian Dudziak
Leszek Dunecki
Paweł Fajdek
Marian Foik
Halina Górecka
Zbigniew Jaremski
Anna Jesień
Celina Jesionowska
Jarosława Jóźwiakowska
Ryszard Katus
Urszula Kielan
Ewa Kłobukowska
Władysław Komar
Halina Konopacka
Robert Korzeniowski
Władysław Kozakiewicz
Elżbieta Krzesińska
Zdzisław Krzyszkowiak
Adam Kszczot
Andrzej Kupczyk
Janusz Kusociński
Maria Kwaśniewska
Lucyna Langer
Marcin Lewandowski
Zenon Licznerski
Tomasz Majewski
Piotr Małachowski
Bronisław Malinowski
Bogusław Mamiński
Wiesław Maniak
Aleksandra Mirosław
Artur Partyka
Jerzy Pietrzyk
Marek Plawgo
Ryszard Podlas
Monika Pyrek
Anna Rogowska
Tadeusz Rut
Janusz Sidło
Kamila Skolimowska
Tadeusz Ślusarski
Barbara Sobotta
Irena Szewińska
Józef Szmidt
Jadwiga Wajs
Stanisława Walasiewicz
Sebastian Wenta
Jan Werner
Joanna Wiśniewska
Anita Włodarczyk
Urszula Włodarczyk
Paweł Wojciechowski
Marian Woronin
Jacek Wszoła
Krystyna Zabawska
Andrzej Zieliński
Kazimierz Zimny
Szymon Ziółkowski
Krzysztof Zwoliński

Badminton 

Robert Mateusiak
Nadieżda Zięba

Basketball 

Aleksander Balcerowski
Agnieszka Bibrzycka
Aaron Cel
Margo Dydek
Aleksander Dziewa
Jacob Eisner
Jakub Garbacz
Marcin Gortat
Michał Ignerski
Edward Jurkiewicz
Przemek Karnowski
Thomas Kelati
Eugeniusz Kijewski
Ewelina Kobryn
Łukasz Kolenda
Łukasz Koszarek
Maciej Lampe
Mieczysław Łopatka
Dominik Olejniczak
Andrzej Pluta
Mateusz Ponitka
A. J. Slaughter
Jeremy Sochan
Michał Sokołowski
Szymon Szewczyk
Krzysztof Szubarga
Cezary Trybański
Adam Waczyński
Adam Wójcik
Jarosław Zyskowski

Beach volleyball 

Monika Brzostek
Grzegorz Fijałek
Kinga Kołosińska
Mariusz Prudel
Jakub Szałankiewicz

Biathlon 

Magdalena Gwizdoń
Monika Hojnisz
Zofia Kiełpińska
Stanisław Łukaszczyk
Helena Mikołajczyk
Weronika Nowakowska-Ziemniak
Krystyna Guzik
Andrzej Rapacz
Józef Rubiś
Tomasz Sikora
Józef Sobczak
Anna Stera-Kustusz
Stanisław Szczepaniak

Bobsleigh 

Dawid Kupczyk
Paweł Mróz
Marcin Niewiara
Michał Zblewski

Boxing 

Kazimierz Adach
Tomasz Adamek
Jerzy Adamski
Aleksy Antkiewicz
Wojciech Bartnik
Brunon Bendig
Leszek Błażyński
Zygmunt Chychła
Stanisław Dragan
Leszek Drogosz
Jan Dydak
Krzysztof Głowacki
Andrzej Gołota
Janusz Gortat
Józef Grudzień
Józef Grzesiak
Nikodem Jeżewski
Marian Kasprzyk
Leszek Kosedowski
Krzysztof Kosedowski
Jerzy Kulej
Dariusz Michalczewski
Karolina Michalczuk
Henryk Niedźwiedzki
Artur Olech
Kazimierz Paździor
Henryk Petrich
Zbigniew Pietrzykowski
Grzegorz Proksa
Wiesław Rudkowski
Jerzy Rybicki
Grzegorz Skrzecz
Paweł Skrzecz
Hubert Skrzypczak
Jan Szczepański
Kazimierz Szczerba
Artur Szpilka
Mariusz Wach
Tadeusz Walasek
Krzysztof Włodarczyk
Janusz Zarenkiewicz

Canoeing 

Paweł Baraszkiewicz
Dariusz Białkowski
Izabela Dylewska
Marek Dopierała
Edyta Dzieniszewska
Maciej Freimut
Andrzej Gronowicz
Marcin Grzybowski
Daniel Jędraszko
Stefan Kapłaniak
Krzysztof Kołomański
Aneta Konieczna
Grzegorz Kotowicz
Magdalena Krukowska
Wojciech Kurpiewski
Marek Łbik
Piotr Markiewicz
Beata Mikołajczyk
Karolina Naja
Jerzy Opara
Rafał Piszcz
Grzegorz Polaczyk
Mateusz Polaczyk
Dariusz Popiela
Adam Seroczyński
Piotr Siemionowski
Beata Sokołowska-Kulesza
Michał Staniszewski
Władysław Szuszkiewicz
Marek Twardowski
Marta Walczykiewicz
Daniela Walkowiak-Pilecka
Marek Witkowski
Ewelina Wojnarowska
Władysław Zieliński

Cross-Country skiing 

Sylwia Jaśkowiec
Justyna Kowalczyk
Józef Łuszczek
Jan Staszel

Cycling 

Edward Barcik
Andrzej Bek
Joachim Halupczok
Zenon Jaskuła
Janusz Kierzkowski
Benedykt Kocot
Michał Kwiatkowski
Czesław Lang
Józef Lange
Jan Łazarski
Marek Leśniewski
Lucjan Lis
Rafał Majka
Tadeusz Mytnik
Mieczysław Nowicki
Tomasz Stankiewicz
Andrzej Sypytkowski
Stanisław Szozda
Ryszard Szurkowski
Franciszek Szymczyk
Maja Włoszczowska

Equestrian 

Michał Antoniewicz
Janusz Bobik
Kazimierz Gzowski
Wiesław Hartman
Zdzisław Kawecki
Jan Kowalczyk
Marian Kozicki
Adam Królikiewicz
Seweryn Kulesza
Janusz Olech
Henryk Leliwa-Roycewicz
Karol Rómmel
Kazimierz Szosland
Józef Trenkwald
Maria Zandbang

Fencing 

Robert Andrzejuk
Egon Franke
Sylwia Gruchała
Piotr Jabłkowski
Piotr Kiełpikowski
Adam Krzesiński
Andrzej Lis
Tomasz Motyka
Magdalena Mroczkiewicz
Jerzy Pawłowski
Anna Rybicka
Cezary Siess
Ryszard Sobczak
Aleksandra Socha
Mariusz Strzałka
Leszek Swornowski
Marian Sypniewski
Adam Wiercioch
Barbara Wolnicka-Szewczyk
Witold Woyda
Radosław Zawrotniak

Field hockey 

Tomasz Choczaj
Tomasz Cichy
Eugeniusz Gaczkowski
Rafał Grotowski
Robert Grzeszczak
Paweł Jakubiak
Zbigniew Juszczak
Aleksander Korcz
Dariusz Małecki
Dariusz Marcinkowski
Piotr Mikuła
Marcin Pobuta
Paweł Sobczak
Tomasz Szmidt
Krzysztof Wybieralski
Łukasz Wybieralski

Figure skating 

Grzegorz Filipowski
Mariusz Siudek
Dorota Zagórska

Football 

Jakub Błaszczykowski
Zbigniew Boniek
Artur Boruc
Kazimierz Deyna
Jan Domarski
Jerzy Dudek
Marek Fundakowski (born 1988), striker
Paul Freier (Polish born)
Robert Gadocha
Jerzy Gorgoń
Kazimierz Górski
Paweł Janas
Andrzej Juskowiak
Jacek Krzynówek
Zbigniew Kaczmarek
Henryk Kasperczak
Miroslav Klose (Mirosław Klose, Polish born)
Hubert Kostka
Józef Klotz (1900–1941)
Wojciech Krauze
Grzegorz Lato
Robert Lewandowski
Włodzimierz Lubański
Józef Młynarczyk
Piotr Nowak
Emmanuel Olisadebe
Łukasz Piszczek
Lukas Podolski (Łukasz Podolski, Polish born)
Tomasz Radzinski (Polish born)
Grzegorz Rasiak
Marek Saganowski
Euzebiusz Smolarek
Włodzimierz Smolarek
Andrzej Szarmach
Jan Tomaszewski
Władysław Żmuda
Maciej Żurawski

Formula one 

Robert Kubica

Freestyle skiing 
Karolina Riemen

Gymnastics 

Leszek Blanik
Jerzy Jokiel
Natalia Kot
Joanna Mitrosz
Helena Rakoczy

Handball 

Zdzisław Antczak
Karol Bielecki
Janusz Brzozowski
Kinga Byzdra
Piotr Cieśla
Jan Gmyrek
Mateusz Jachlewski
Mariusz Jurasik
Bartosz Jurecki
Michał Jurecki
Alfred Kałuziński
Jerzy Klempel
Patryk Kuchczyński
Zygfryd Kuchta
Karolina Kudłacz
Zbigniew Kwiatkowski
Krzysztof Lijewski
Marcin Lijewski
Jerzy Melcer
Ryszard Przybysz
Henryk Rozmiarek
Artur Siódmiak
Andrzej Sokołowski
Sławomir Szmal
Karolina Szwed-Orneborg
Andrzej Szymczak
Grzegorz Tkaczyk
Tomasz Tłuczyński
Adam Weiner
Bogdan Wenta
Damian Wleklak
Mieczysław Wojczak
Alina Wojtas
Włodzimierz Zieliński

Ice hockey 

Mariusz Czerkawski
Krzysztof Oliwa
Wojtek Wolski

Judo 

Rafał Kubacki
Waldemar Legień
Beata Maksymow
Paweł Nastula
Janusz Pawłowski
Aneta Szczepańska
Paweł Zagrodnik
Janusz Wojnarowicz

Luge 

Helena Boettcher
Edward Fender
Barbara Gorgoń
Jerzy Koszla
Lucjan Kudzia
Maciej Kurowski
Andrzej Laszczak
Krzysztof Niewiadomski
Danuta Nycz
Mieczysław Pawełkiewicz
Irena Pawełczyk
Ryszard Pędrak-Janowicz
Barbara Piecha
Oktawian Samulski
Maria Semczyszak
Janina Susczewska
Damian Waniczek
Jerzy Wojnar

Modern pentathlon 

Maciej Czyżowicz
Dariusz Goździak
Dorota Idzi
Janusz Pyciak-Peciak
Arkadiusz Skrzypaszek

Motorboat 

Bernard Marszałek

Mountaineering 

Jerzy Kukuczka
Piotr Pustelnik
Wanda Rutkiewicz
Krzysztof Wielicki

Nordic combined 

Franciszek Gąsienica Groń
Stefan Hula, Sr.

Rallying 

Kuba Giermaziak
Janusz Kulig
Sobiesław Zasada

Rowing 

Miłosz Bernatajtys
Kajetan Broniewski
Michał Cieślak
Małgorzata Dłużewska
Magdalena Fularczyk
Wojciech Jankowski
Michał Jeliński
Teodor Kocerka
Marek Kolbowicz
Adam Korol
Czesława Kościańska
Tomasz Kucharski
Maciej Łasicki
Julia Michalska
Bartłomiej Pawełczak
Łukasz Pawłowski
Paweł Rańda
Jacek Streich
Robert Sycz
Tomasz Tomiak
Konrad Wasielewski

Sailing 

Mateusz Kusznierewicz
Przemysław Miarczyński
Zofia Noceti-Klepacka

Shooting 

Sylwia Bogacka
Władysław Karaś
Małgorzata Książkiewicz
Renata Mauer
Mirosław Rzepkowski
Adam Smelczyński
Józef Zapędzki

Ski jumping 

Stanisław Bobak
Piotr Fijas
Wojciech Fortuna
Stanisław Gąsienica Daniel
Stefan Hula
Maciej Kot
Dawid Kubacki
Antoni Łaciak
Adam Małysz
Stanisław Marusarz
Andrzej Stękała
Kamil Stoch
Piotr Żyła

Snowboarding 

Paulina Ligocka
Jagna Marczułajtis

Speed skating 

Zbigniew Bródka
Katarzyna Bachleda-Curuś
Natalia Czerwonka
Konrad Niedźwiedzki
Helena Pilejczyk
Erwina Ryś-Ferens
Elwira Seroczyńska
Jan Szymański
Katarzyna Woźniak
Luiza Złotkowska

Speedway 

Tomasz Gollob
Jarosław Hampel
Edward Jancarz
Jerzy Szczakiel
Andrzej Wyglenda
Bartosz Zmarzlik

Strongman 

Mateusz Kieliszkowski
Sławomir Orzeł
Mariusz Pudzianowski

Swimming 

Konrad Czerniak
Agnieszka Czopek
Otylia Jędrzejczak
Radosław Kawęcki
Paweł Korzeniowski
Mateusz Sawrymowicz
Rafał Szukała
Artur Wojdat

Table tennis 

Andrzej Grubba
Natalia Partyka

Tennis 

Marta Domachowska
Wojtek Fibak
Mariusz Fyrstenberg
Hubert Hurkacz
Jerzy Janowicz
Jadwiga Jędrzejowska
Angelique Kerber (Andżelika Kerber, Polish born)
Łukasz Kubot
Magda Linette
Marcin Matkowski
Michał Przysiężny
Agnieszka Radwańska
Urszula Radwańska
Iga Świątek
Bohdan Tomaszewski

Volleyball 

Halina Aszkiełowicz
Natalia Bamber
Zbigniew Bartman
Bronisław Bebel
Agnieszka Bednarek-Kasza
Izabela Bełcik
Ryszard Bosek
Hanna Busz
Lidia Chmielnicka
Krystyna Czajkowska
Eleonora Dziękiewicz
Katarzyna Gajgał
Wiesław Gawłowski
Małgorzata Glinka
Maria Golimowska
Piotr Gruszka
Krzysztof Ignaczak
Aleksandra Jagieło
Krystyna Jakubowska
Jakub Jarosz
Joanna Kaczor
Klaudia Kaczorowska
Marek Karbarz
Danuta Kordaczuk
Grzegorz Kosok
Krystyna Krupa
Jadwiga Książek
Michał Kubiak
Bartosz Kurek
Lech Łasko
Józefa Ledwig
Dominika Leśniewicz
Maria Liktoras
Zbigniew Lubiejewski
Paulina Maj
Joanna Mirek
Marcin Możdżonek
Agata Mróz-Olszewska
Barbara Niemczyk
Małgorzata Niemczyk
Piotr Nowakowski
Krystyna Ostromęcka
Anna Podolec
Elżbieta Porzec
Sylwia Pycia
Milena Rosner 
Michał Ruciak
Jadwiga Rutkowska
Mirosław Rybaczewski
Włodzimierz Sadalski
Milena Sadurek
Edward Skorek
Katarzyna Skowrońska
Magdalena Śliwa
Maria Śliwka
Włodzimierz Stefański
Sebastian Świderski
Dorota Świeniewicz
Zofia Szczęśniewska
Anna Werblińska
Wanda Wiecha
Michał Winiarski
Łukasz Wiśniewski
Mariusz Wlazły
Tomasz Wójtowicz
Paweł Zagumny
Zbigniew Zarzycki
Paweł Zatorski
Mariola Zenik
Łukasz Żygadło

Weightlifting 

Waldemar Baszanowski 
Jan Bochenek
Bartłomiej Bonk
Kazimierz Czarnecki
Grzegorz Cziura
Marcin Dołęga
Marek Gołąb
Zbigniew Kaczmarek
Szymon Kołecki
Waldemar Malak
Mieczysław Nowak
Norbert Ozimek
Ireneusz Paliński
Tadeusz Rutkowski
Norbert Schemansky
Marek Seweryn
Zygmunt Smalcerz
Stanley Stanczyk
Henryk Trębicki
Agata Wróbel
Adrian Zieliński
Marian Zieliński

Wrestling 

Roman Bierła
Jan Dołgowicz
Jacek Fafiński
Marek Garmulewicz
Andrzej Głąb
Damian Janikowski
Józef Lipień
Kazimierz Lipień
Monika Michalik
Adam Sandurski
Władysław Stecyk
Piotr Stępień
Andrzej Supron
Józef Tracz
Agnieszka Wieszczek
Ryszard Wolny
Andrzej Wroński
Włodzimierz Zawadzki

See also
Poland at the Olympics
Poland at the Paralympics
Sport in Poland

List
 
Sports players
Polish